Methylene diphenyl diisocyanate (MDI) is an aromatic diisocyanate. Three isomers are common, varying by the positions of the isocyanate groups around the rings: 2,2′-MDI, 2,4′-MDI, and 4,4′-MDI. The 4,4′ isomer is most widely used, and is also known as 4,4′-diphenylmethane diisocyanate.  This isomer is also known as Pure MDI. MDI reacts with polyols in the manufacture of polyurethane. It is the most produced diisocyanate, accounting for 61.3% of the global market in the year 2000.

Production
Total world production of MDI and polymeric MDI is over 7.5 million tonnes per year (in 2017).

As of 2019, the largest producer was Wanhua Chemical Group. Other major producers are Covestro, BASF, Dow, Huntsman, Tosoh, Kumho Mitsui Chemicals. All major producers of MDI are members of the International Isocyanate Institute, whose aim is the promotion of the safe handling of MDI and TDI in the workplace, community and environment.

The first step of the production of MDI is the reaction of aniline  and formaldehyde, using hydrochloric acid as a catalyst to produce a mixture of diamine precursors, as well as their corresponding polyamines:

Then, these diamines are treated with phosgene to form a mixture of isocyanates, the isomer ratio being determined by the isomeric composition of the diamine. Two different reaction mechanisms for this transformation are possible, namely "phosgenations first" and "step-wise phosgenations".

Distillation of the mixture gives a mixture of oligomeric polyisocyanates, known as polymeric MDI, and a mixture of MDI isomers which has a low 2,4′ isomer content.  Further purification entails fractionation of the MDI isomer mixture.

Reactivity of the isocyanate group
The positions of the isocyanate groups influences their reactivity. In 4,4′-MDI, the two isocyanate groups are equivalent but in 2,4′-MDI the two groups display highly differing reactivities. The group at the 4-position is approximately four times more reactive than the group at the 2-position due to steric hindrance.

Applications
The major application of 4,4′-MDI is the production of rigid polyurethane. These rigid polyurethane foams are good thermal insulators and used in nearly all freezers and refrigerators worldwide, as well as buildings. Typical polyols used are polyethylene adipate (a polyester) and poly(tetramethylene ether) glycol (a polyether).

4,4′-MDI is also used as an industrial strength adhesive, which is available to end consumers as various high-strength bottled glue preparations.

Safety
MDI, like the other isocyanates, is an allergen and sensitizer.  Persons developing sensitivity to isocyanates may have dangerous systemic reactions to extremely small exposures, including respiratory failure.  Handling MDI requires strict engineering controls and personal protective equipment. It is a potentially violently reactive material towards water and other nucleophiles.

References

External links
 International Chemical Safety Card 0298
 IARC Monograph: "4,4'-Methylenediphenyl Diisocyanate"
 NIOSH Safety and Health Topic: Isocyanates, from the website of the National Institute for Occupational Safety and Health (NIOSH)
 Isofact American Chemistry Council Diisocyanates Panel
 Azom Chemical database on Polyurethane chemistry
 MDI and the Environment - 2005 presentation by Center for the Polyurethanes Industry
 International Isocyanate Institute
 Concise International Chemical Assessment Document 27

Isocyanates
Monomers
IARC Group 3 carcinogens